Nattheim is a municipality in the district of Heidenheim in Baden-Württemberg in southern Germany. The town hall  is located in the middle of the city, and is situated at the intersection of the city church building and pharmacy.  Nattheim has 4 grocery stores (Lidl, Rewe, Netto & Norma), Sonderpreis hardware store, as well as Rossman and Ernstings Family. 

Home of "Nattheimer" brand beer and is largely a farming community with a few industrial companies.

References

Heidenheim (district)